Arianrhod Hyde (also known as Roddy) is a fictional character from the novel The Merlin Conspiracy, written by Diana Wynne Jones, published by HarperCollinsPublishers. Arianrhod Hyde is one of the two protagonists in the novel.

Introduction 
A description is taken from a character's thoughts, depicting her as "a girl with dark, curly hair and big, blue-grey eyes with nice eyelashes. Her face was thin and so was the rest of her body. she was one of those girls who look as if they've just happened somehow." She is also described as an anxious girl and has a commanding and forceful nature, as shown several times in the story.

Very few facts are given about the early life of the character itself, a teenage girl who is a member of the Court, a group of selected people chosen for a specific job. The highest ranking Court member is the Archbishop, followed by Grundo's mother, who is an earth wizard, a mixture of bishops, high officials and priests and priestesses of older powers, while Roddy's father is situated near the back, for he is not a priest, only a weather worker.

The story starts with Roddy's narration, explaining a little about her past, and Grundo's as well. It then proceeds to a point where her mother tries to do her usual attempt to talk Roddy into staying with her grandfather Hyde. Roddy refuses, as she does not want to leave Grundo alone with his mother and sister. She points out to her mother that her grandfather Hyde grows dahlias, saying that it is a stupid thing for a powerful magician to do. Her mother stoutly insisted that Roddy must stay with her grandfather, until Roddy mentioned her mother's father, Gwyn, after which Roddy's mother went away.

Characters in children's literature